Jón Daði Böðvarsson (transliterated as Jon Dadi Bodvarsson; born 25 May 1992) is an Icelandic professional footballer who plays as a right winger or a striker for League One club Bolton Wanderers and the Iceland national team. Jón Daði is the grandson of one Iceland's premier poets, Þorsteinn frá Hamri.

Club career
Jón Daði began his senior career during the 2009 season in the Icelandic second tier with Selfoss, scoring 20 as their side were promoted to the Icelandic top flight. After being loaned to the youth ranks of the Danish club Aarhus for four months in 2011, he returned to Selfoss, who had been relegated in the meantime. They scored seventy times during the 2011 season as the club were promoted back to the top flight.

After netting a further seventy goals back in the top division, Jón Daði moved to the Norwegian side Viking in November 2012. During three seasons in the Norwegian top flight, he scored 15 times before leaving for German second division side 1. FC Kaiserslautern in January 2016, with whom he had already signed a pre-contract in June 2015 for a three-year deal. He made his Kaiserslautern debut on 5 February 2016 against Union Berlin and scored the first of two goals for the team on 4 March 2016 in a 1–2 defeat at Nürnberg.

On 2 August 2016, Jón Daði signed for English Championship side Wolverhampton Wanderers for an undisclosed fee on a three-year deal. He scored his first goal on his debut for the club on 6 August 2016 in a 2–2 draw against Rotherham. His debut simultaneously meant he became the 1,000th player to appear in a league game for the club. Jón Daði scored his second goal for Wolves on 20 August, scoring the final goal in Wolves' 3–1 win against Birmingham City. His third and final goal for Wolves was in a 3–1 defeat to Bristol City in April 2017.

Despite being a fan favourite at Wolves, he moved to fellow English Championship side Reading in a three-year deal for an undisclosed fee on 14 July 2017. He scored his first goal for Reading in a 2–0 win at Birmingham City on 26 August 2017. His first hat trick for Reading was on 16 January 2018 in the 3rd round of the FA Cup.

On 12 July 2019, he signed for fellow Championship side Millwall for an undisclosed fee. He scored his first goals for Millwall when he scored twice in an EFL Cup tie against Oxford United on 27 August 2019.

On 20 January 2022, he signed for League One side Bolton Wanderers on an eighteen-month contract after his Millwall contract was cancelled, taking over the number 9 shirt from the recently departed Eoin Doyle.

International career
Having already played for Iceland at under-19 and under-21 level, Jón Daði made his full international debut on 14 November 2012 as a substitute in a friendly against Andorra. He scored his first international goal on 9 September 2014 in a 3–0 victory over Turkey during Euro 2016 qualifying.

He was selected for UEFA Euro 2016, the first international tournament for which Iceland had ever qualified. Jón Daði started all five matches at the tournament in France and scored in the final group game against Austria which ensured the Icelanders' progress from the group phase.

On 27 June 2016, Jón Daði played against England in the UEFA Euro 2016 round of 16 at the Stade de Nice, as Iceland upset England with a 2–1 victory to advance to the quarter-finals.

Böðvarsson was called up to Iceland's 23-man squad for the 2018 FIFA World Cup on 11 May 2018.

Career statistics

Club

Notes

International

Scores and results list Iceland's goal tally first, score column indicates score after each Jón Daði goal.

References

External links

Profile on KSÍ's official website.

Living people
1992 births
Jon Dadi Bodvarsson
Jon Dadi Bodvarsson
Jon Dadi Bodvarsson
Jon Dadi Bodvarsson
Association football midfielders
Jon Dadi Bodvarsson
Jon Dadi Bodvarsson
Jon Dadi Bodvarsson
Viking FK players
1. FC Kaiserslautern players
Wolverhampton Wanderers F.C. players
Reading F.C. players
Millwall F.C. players
Bolton Wanderers F.C. players
Eliteserien players
2. Bundesliga players
English Football League players
Jon Dadi Bodvarsson
Expatriate footballers in Norway
Jon Dadi Bodvarsson
Expatriate footballers in England
Jon Dadi Bodvarsson
Expatriate footballers in Germany
Jon Dadi Bodvarsson
UEFA Euro 2016 players
2018 FIFA World Cup players